This is a list of notable restaurants in Mexico. A restaurant is a business  which prepares and serves food and drink to customers in return for money, either paid before the meal, after the meal, or with an open account.

Restaurants in Mexico

 Andale's Restaurant & Bar, Puerto Vallarta
 The Blue Shrimp, Puerto Vallarta
 Café des Artistes, Puerto Vallarta
 Coco's Kitchen, Puerto Vallarta
 El Dorado, Puerto Vallarta
 Fredy's Tucan, Puerto Vallarta
 Grupo Anderson's
 Grupo Sanborns
 Hussong's
 La Palapa, Puerto Vallarta
 Los Muertos Brewing, Puerto Vallarta
 The Pancake House, Puerto Vallarta
 Restaurante Arroyo
 Ritmos Beach Cafe, Puerto Vallarta
 River Cafe, Puerto Vallarta
 Toks

Mexico City
There are approximately 15,000 restaurants in Mexico City.

 Alsea – based in Mexico City
 Biko – specializes in Basque cuisine
 Pujol
 San Ángel Inn – old Carmelite monastery which was turned into a well-known restaurant

See also
 List of Mexican restaurants
 Lists of restaurants
 Mexican cuisine

References

Mexico
Restaurants in Mexico